Nicole Turner (born 14 June 2002), of Portarlington, Laois, is an Irish para-swimmer, competing mainly in the S6, short stature category.

Turner has won medals in the youth category at the 2015 British International, senior at the 2016 IPC Swimming European Open Championships and the 2018 European Para-Swimming Championships, and in the youth final in the World Para Swimming Series in 2019.

Personal life
Turner was born with hypochondroplasia, making her of short stature. Nicole started swimming with her local club, Portarlington Piranhas, before moving to Laois Marlins in Portlaoise. She moved to train with Ireland’s top swimmers at the National Aquatic Centre in Dublin in 2017. In 2019, after completing transition year, she deferred her secondary school studies to train fulltime for Tokyo. Nicole was the flagbearer for Team Ireland at the Rio Paralympics closing ceremony.

Career
Turner represented Ireland for the first time at a senior level at the 2015 British Para-Swimming International Meet, 26–29 March, where she placed fifth in the women's MC 50m butterfly. She won a silver medal in the Youth category in the 50m butterfly.

Paralympic Games
Turner competed in five events at the 2016 Summer Paralympics in Rio de Janeiro. Her best placing was fifth in 50m butterfly S6, an event in which Ellie Robinson won gold, Oksana Khrul silver, and Australia's Tiffany Thomas Kane bronze. She was the youngest member of the Ireland team and was selected as the closing ceremony flag-bearer.

Turner competed at the 2020 Summer Paralympics in Tokyo and won a silver medal in the women's 50 metre butterfly S6.

IPC Swimming World Championships
At the IPC Swimming World Championships in Glasgow in July 2015, at the age of 13, Turner reached the final in each of the six events she entered, setting personal bests in each. She finished fifth in the S6 400m freestyle, fifth in the SB6 100m breaststroke, sixth in the S6 50m butterfly, sixth in the S6 50m freestyle, eighth in the S6 200m individual medley, and seventh in the S6 100m freestyle.

IPC Swimming European Championships
At the 2016 IPC Swimming European Championships in Funchal, 30 April - 7 May, Turner reach the finals in six events and took home three medals. She won silver in the 200m Individual Medley SM6 behind Ukraine's Yelyzaveta Mereshko, silver in the 100m Breaststroke SB6 behind Charlotte Henshaw of Great Britain, and bronze in the 50m Butterfly S6 behind Oksana Khrul (Ukraine) in gold medal position and Ellie Robinson (Great Britain) on bronze. In her other events, she placed fifth in the 100m Freestyle S6, sixth in the 50m Freestyle S6, and fourth in the 400m Freestyle S6.

World Para Swimming European Championships
In the 2018 World Para Swimming European Championships (renamed that year), Turner won silver in the 50m butterfly, as Ellie Robinson took gold.

References

2002 births
Living people
Paralympic swimmers of Ireland
Irish female swimmers
Swimmers at the 2016 Summer Paralympics
Swimmers at the 2020 Summer Paralympics
Medalists at the 2020 Summer Paralympics
Paralympic silver medalists for Ireland
Paralympic medalists in swimming
S6-classified Paralympic swimmers
Medalists at the World Para Swimming Championships
Medalists at the World Para Swimming European Championships
21st-century Irish women